Alexis Thépot (30 July 1906 – 21 February 1989) was a French footballer. He was the goalkeeper of the France national team in the first two World Cups, 1930 and 1934, and an Olympian.

Club career
Thépot was born in Brest, Finistère. He played for Armoricaine de Brest (1922–1927), FEC Levallois (1927–28), Red Star FC (1928–1935), and USL Dunkerque (1935–1936). After a good year with Levallois, he was selected to play his first international match against England in 1927.

International career
From 1927 to 1935, Thépot played in 31 international matches, conceding 77 goals, and was captain of the French team 13 times.

Thépot appeared in France's first ever World Cup match against Mexico in 1930, although he had to abandon the match during the first half due to an injury, being replaced in goal by half Augustin Chantrel. Thépot would come back and play in the next two matches, but his team was unable to go past the group stage, losing to Argentina 1–0 on a late goal, and 1–0 to Chile, despite having saved a penalty kick while the match was still 0–0.

He played France's only match at the 1928 Olympic Games, a 4–3 loss to Italy.

References

External links
 
 

1906 births
1989 deaths
Sportspeople from Brest, France
Association football goalkeepers
French footballers
Footballers from Brittany
Stade Brestois 29 players
Red Star F.C. players
USL Dunkerque players
France international footballers
Olympic footballers of France
Footballers at the 1928 Summer Olympics
1930 FIFA World Cup players
1934 FIFA World Cup players